Miami area may refer to:

 Miami metropolitan area in southern Florida, United States
 Miami, Oklahoma micropolitan area, United States